Opal is an unincorporated community in Meade County, in the U.S. state of South Dakota.

History
Opal was laid out in 1907. A post office was established at Opal in 1909.

References

Unincorporated communities in Meade County, South Dakota
Unincorporated communities in South Dakota